Interstitial lung disease (ILD), or diffuse parenchymal lung disease (DPLD), is a group of respiratory diseases affecting the interstitium (the tissue and space around the alveoli (air sacs)) of the lungs. It concerns alveolar epithelium, pulmonary capillary endothelium, basement membrane, and perivascular and perilymphatic tissues. It may occur when an injury to the lungs triggers an abnormal healing response. Ordinarily, the body generates just the right amount of tissue to repair damage, but in interstitial lung disease, the repair process is disrupted, and the tissue around the air sacs (alveoli) becomes scarred and thickened. This makes it more difficult for oxygen to pass into the bloodstream. The disease presents itself with the following symptoms: shortness of breath, nonproductive coughing, fatigue, and weight loss, which tend to develop slowly, over several months. The average rate of survival for someone with this disease is between three and five years. The term ILD is used to distinguish these diseases from obstructive airways diseases.

There are specific types in children, known as children's interstitial lung diseases. The acronym ChILD is sometimes used for this group of diseases.

Prolonged ILD may result in pulmonary fibrosis, but this is not always the case. Idiopathic pulmonary fibrosis is interstitial lung disease for which no obvious cause can be identified (idiopathic) and is associated with typical findings both radiographic (basal and pleural-based fibrosis with honeycombing) and pathologic (temporally and spatially heterogeneous fibrosis, histopathologic honeycombing, and fibroblastic foci).

In 2015, interstitial lung disease, together with pulmonary sarcoidosis, affected 1.9 million people. They resulted in 122,000 deaths.

Causes 

An ILD may be classified as to whether its cause is not known (idiopathic) or known (secondary).

Idiopathic
Idiopathic interstitial pneumonia is the term given to ILDs with an unknown cause. They represent the majority of cases of interstitial lung diseases (up to two-thirds of cases). They were subclassified by the American Thoracic Society in 2002 into 7 subgroups:
 Idiopathic pulmonary fibrosis (IPF): the most common subgroup
 Desquamative interstitial pneumonia (DIP)
 Acute interstitial pneumonia (AIP): also known as Hamman-Rich syndrome
 Nonspecific interstitial pneumonia (NSIP)
 Respiratory bronchiolitis-associated interstitial lung disease (RB-ILD)
 Cryptogenic organizing pneumonia (COP): also known by the older name bronchiolitis obliterans organizing pneumonia (BOOP)
 Lymphoid interstitial pneumonia (LIP)

Secondary
Secondary ILDs are those diseases with a known etiology, including:
 Connective tissue and Autoimmune diseases
 Sarcoidosis
 Rheumatoid arthritis
 Systemic lupus erythematosus
 Systemic sclerosis
 Polymyositis
 Dermatomyositis
 Antisynthetase syndrome
 Inhaled substances (Pneumoconiosis)
 Inorganic
 Silicosis
 Asbestosis
 Berylliosis
 Industrial printing chemicals (e.g. carbon black, ink mist)
 Organic
 Hypersensitivity pneumonitis (extrinisic allergic alveolitis)
 Drug-induced
 Antibiotics
 Chemotherapeutic drugs
 Antiarrhythmic agents
 Cigarette smoking.
 Smoking-related interstitial fibrosis (SRIF) is an example of a type of interstitial lung disease known to be caused by smoking. 
 Infection
 Coronavirus disease 2019
 Atypical pneumonia
 Pneumocystis pneumonia (PCP)
 Tuberculosis
 Chlamydia trachomatis
 Respiratory Syncytial Virus
 Malignancy
 Lymphangitic carcinomatosis
 Predominately in children
 Diffuse developmental disorders
 Growth abnormalities deficient alveolarisation
 Infant conditions of undefined cause
 ILD related to alveolar surfactant region

Diagnosis 

Investigation is tailored towards the symptoms and signs. A proper and detailed history looking for the occupational exposures, and for signs of conditions listed above is the first and probably the most important part of the workup in patients with interstitial lung disease. Pulmonary function tests usually show a restrictive defect with decreased diffusion capacity (DLCO).

A lung biopsy is required if the clinical history and imaging are not clearly suggestive of a specific diagnosis or malignancy cannot otherwise be ruled out. In cases where a lung biopsy is indicated, a trans-bronchial biopsy is usually unhelpful, and a surgical lung biopsy is often required.

Pulmonary Function Testing 
Most patients with suspected ILD are likely to undergo complete pulmonary function testing. These tests are useful in diagnosis and determining severity of the disease.

Although there is large diversity in interstitial lung disease, most follow a restrictive pattern. Restrictive defects are defined by decreased TLC (total lung capacity), RV (residual volume), FVC (forced vital capacity) and FEV1 (forced expiratory volume in one second). As both FVC and FEV1 are reduced the FVC to FEV1 ratio remains normal or is increased.

As disease progression increases and the lungs become stiffer lung volumes will continue to decrease. Lower TLC, RV, FVC and FEV1 scores are associated with a more severe disease progression and poorer prognosis.

X-rays 

Chest radiography is usually the first test to detect interstitial lung diseases, but the chest radiograph can be normal in up to 10% of patients, especially early in the disease process.

High resolution CT of the chest is the preferred modality, and differs from routine CT of the chest. Conventional (regular) CT chest examines 7–10 mm slices obtained
at 10 mm intervals; high resolution CT examines 1–1.5 mm slices at 10 mm
intervals using a high spatial frequency reconstruction algorithm. The HRCT therefore provides approximately 10 times more resolution than the conventional CT chest,  allowing the HRCT to elicit details that cannot otherwise be visualized.

Radiologic appearance alone however is not adequate and should be interpreted in the clinical context, keeping in mind the temporal profile of the disease process.

Interstitial lung diseases can be classified according to radiologic patterns.

Pattern of opacities 

Consolidation

Acute: Alveolar hemorrhage syndromes, acute eosinophilic pneumonia, acute interstitial pneumonia, cryptogenic organizing pneumonia

Chronic: Chronic eosinophilic pneumonia, cryptogenic organizing pneumonia, lymphoproliferative disorders, pulmonary alveolar proteinosis, sarcoidosis

Linear or reticular opacities

Acute: Pulmonary edema

Chronic: Idiopathic pulmonary fibrosis, connective tissue-associated interstitial lung diseases, asbestosis, sarcoidosis, hypersensitivity pneumonitis, drug-induced lung disease

Small nodules

Acute: Hypersensitivity pneumonitis

Chronic: Hypersensitivity pneumonitis, sarcoidosis, silicosis, coal workers pneumoconiosis, respiratory bronchiolitis, alveolar microlithiasis

Cystic airspaces

Chronic: Pulmonary langerhans cell histiocytosis, pulmonary lymphangioleiomyomatosis, honeycomb lung caused by IPF or other diseases

Ground glass opacities

Acute: Alveolar hemorrhage syndromes, pulmonary edema, hypersensitivity pneumonitis, acute inhalational exposures, drug-induced lung diseases, acute interstitial pneumonia

Chronic:  Nonspecific interstitial pneumonia, respiratory bronchiolitis associated interstitial lung disease, desquamative interstitial pneumonia, drug-induced lung diseases, pulmonary alveolar proteinosis

Thickened alveolar septa

Acute: Pulmonary edema

Chronic: Lymphangitic carcinomatosis, pulmonary alveolar proteinosis, sarcoidosis, pulmonary veno occlusive disease

Distribution 

Upper lung predominance

Pulmonary Langerhans cell histiocytosis, silicosis, coal workers pneumoconiosis, carmustine related pulmonary fibrosis,  respiratory broncholitis associated with interstitial lung disease.

Lower lung predominance

Idiopathic pulmonary fibrosis, pulmonary fibrosis associated with connective tissue diseases, asbestosis, chronic aspiration

Central predominance (perihilar)

Sarcoidosis, berylliosis

Peripheral predominance

Idiopathic pulmonary fibrosis, chronic eosinophilic pneumonia, cryptogenic organizing pneumonia

Associated findings 

Pleural effusion or thickening

Pulmonary edema, connective tissue diseases, asbestosis, lymphangitic carcinomatosis, lymphoma, lymphangioleiomyomatosis, drug-induced lung diseases

Lymphadenopathy

Sarcoidosis, silicosis, berylliosis, lymphangitic carcinomatosis, lymphoma, lymphocytic interstitial pneumonia

Genetic testing 

For some types of paediatric ILDs and few forms adult ILDs, genetic causes have been identified. These may be identified by blood tests. For a limited number of cases, this is a definite advantage, as a precise molecular diagnosis can be done; frequently then there is no need for a lung biopsy. Testing is available for

ILDs related to alveolar surfactant region 

Surfactant-Protein-B Deficiency (Mutations in SFTPB)

Surfactant-Protein-C Deficiency (Mutations in SFTPC)

ABCA3-Deficiency (Mutations in ABCA3)

Brain Lung Thyroid Syndrome (Mutations in TTF1)

Congenital Pulmonary Alveolar Proteinosis (Mutations in CSFR2A, CSFR2B)

Diffuse developmental disorder 

Alveolar Capillary Dysplasia (Mutations in FoxF1)

Idiopathic pulmonary fibrosis 

Mutations in telomerase reverse transcriptase (TERT)

Mutations in telomerase RNA component (TERC)

Mutations in the regulator of telomere elongation helicase 1 (RTEL1)

Mutations in poly(A)-specific ribonuclease (PARN)

Treatment 

ILD is not a single disease but encompasses many different pathological processes. Hence treatment is different for each disease. If a specific occupational exposure cause is found, the person should avoid that environment. If a drug cause is suspected, that drug should be discontinued.

Many cases due to unknown or connective tissue-based causes are treated with corticosteroids, such as prednisolone. Some people respond to immunosuppressant treatment. Oxygen therapy at home is recommended in those with significantly low oxygen levels.

Pulmonary rehabilitation appears to be useful with the benefits being sustainable longer term with improvement in exercise capacity, dyspnoea, and quality of life.  Lung transplantation is an option if the ILD progresses despite therapy in appropriately selected patients with no other contraindications.

On October 16, 2014, the Food and Drug Administration approved a new drug for the treatment of Idiopathic Pulmonary Fibrosis (IPF). This drug, Ofev (nintedanib), is marketed by  Boehringer Ingelheim Pharmaceuticals, Inc. This drug has been shown to slow the decline of lung function although the drug has not been shown to reduce mortality or improve lung function. The estimated cost of the drug per year is approximately $94,000.

References 

19. ^Health, St Vincent’s Heart. “Home.” St Vincent's Lung Health, St Vincent's Heart Health, www.svhlunghealth.com.au/conditions/ild-interstitial-lung-disease.

20. ^“Interstitial Lung Disease: Symptoms, Causes, Tests and Treatment.” Cleveland Clinic, my.clevelandclinic.org/health/diseases/17809-interstitial-lung-disease.

External links 

 

Respiratory diseases principally affecting the interstitium
Lung disorders